Clifford John Barton (September 3, 1907 – September 14, 1969)  was an American professional ice hockey right winger. Barton played three seasons in the National Hockey League (NHL) for the Pittsburgh Pirates, Philadelphia Quakers, and New York Rangers between 1929 and 1940. The rest of his career was spent in different minor leagues.

Career statistics

Regular season and playoffs

External links

1907 births
1969 deaths
American men's ice hockey right wingers
Buffalo Bisons (IHL) players
Hershey Bears players
Ice hockey players from Michigan
New Haven Eagles players
New York Rangers players
People from Sault Ste. Marie, Michigan
Philadelphia Quakers (NHL) players
Philadelphia Ramblers players
Pittsburgh Pirates (NHL) players
Pittsburgh Yellow Jackets (IHL) players
St. Louis Flyers (AHA) players
Springfield Indians players
Washington Lions players